U.S. Route 421 (US 421) in the U.S. state of Kentucky is a  north–south United States highway that traverses twelve counties in the central and eastern parts of the state. It travels in a southeast-to-northwest path from the Virginia state line near Pennington Gap to the Indiana state line, on the Ohio River at Milton, Kentucky and Madison, Indiana.

Route description

Virginia state line to Manchester
US 421 enters Harlan County from Lee County, Virginia, and meets US 119 near Harlan. At Hyden, US 421 turns westward towards Clay County, and crosses the Hal Rogers Parkway via an overpass without access near Manchester.

Manchester to Richmond
At Manchester, US 421 turns northwestward towards Jackson County, through McKee. It traverses the far northeastern corner of Rockcastle County before entering Madison County where it joins U.S. 25 south of Richmond near the Blue Grass Army Depot. US 25 and US 421 runs concurrently through Richmond, and all the way to the I-75 junction.

Metro Lexington to Frankfort 
US 25/421 also runs concurrently with I-75 between Exits 97 and 99. After Exit 99, the two U.S. routes continue to run concurrently until downtown Lexington just after crossing US 27/60/68. While US 25 makes a right turn onto Georgetown Road, US 421 continues straight northwestward, as Leestown Pike, towards Midway and Frankfort.

Frankfort to Ohio River
In Frankfort, US 421 has concurrencies with US 60 on the east side of town, and US 127 on the north side. US 421 continues northwestward into Henry and far northern Shelby counties before crossing the Exit 34 exit of I-71. US 42 in Bedford is the last major intersection in Kentucky before US 421 crosses the Ohio River from Trimble County into Jefferson County, Indiana.

History 

US 421 did not have any presence in Kentucky until it was extended into Kentucky and Indiana at one point between 1939 and 1957, probably in the late 1940s or early 1950s. When US 421 was designated into Kentucky, it was routed onto the following existing routes: 
KY 66 from the Virginia state line to Harlan,
KY 257 from Harlan to Hyden,
KY 80 from Hyden to Manchester,
KY 21 from Manchester to Big Hill,
KY 169 from Big Hill to Richmond (including US 25 concurrency), 
KY 50 from downtown Lexington to Frankfort, and
KY 37 from Frankfort to the Indiana state line at Milton.

Current statuses for original assignments of pre-existing routes 
KY 37 now runs from Gravel Switch to Junction City to Danville, in Marion and Boyle Counties in Central Kentucky. 
The remainders of KY 21, KY 169, and KY 257 still retained their original alignments off the current US 421. 
KY 50 no longer exists in the state route system. 
KY 66 is now assigned to a road in Bell, western Leslie and eastern Clay Counties in southeast Kentucky from Middlesboro to US 421/KY 80 near Big Creek

Major Intersections

See also

List of roads in Lexington, Kentucky

References

External links

US 421 at Kentucky Roads

0421
0421
0421
0421
0421
0421
0421
0421
0421
0421
0421
0421
21-4
 Kentucky